David Bissett (born May 13, 1954 in Vancouver, British Columbia) is a former field hockey player from Canada, who twice represented his native country at the Summer Olympics: in 1976 and in 1984. On both occasions he finished in tenth place with the Men's National Team. Bissett is a resident of New Westminster, British Columbia.

International Senior Competitions

 1976 – Olympic Games, Montreal (10th)
 1984 – Olympic Games, Los Angeles (10th)

References
 Canadian Olympic Committee

External links
 
 
 

1949 births
Living people
Canadian male field hockey players
Olympic field hockey players of Canada
Field hockey players at the 1976 Summer Olympics
Field hockey players at the 1984 Summer Olympics
Field hockey players from Vancouver
Pan American Games medalists in field hockey
Pan American Games gold medalists for Canada
Pan American Games silver medalists for Canada
Field hockey players at the 1975 Pan American Games
Field hockey players at the 1979 Pan American Games
Field hockey players at the 1983 Pan American Games
Medalists at the 1975 Pan American Games
Medalists at the 1979 Pan American Games
Medalists at the 1983 Pan American Games